"Amar pelos dois" (English: "To Love for the Both of Us") is a song recorded by Portuguese singer Salvador Sobral. The song was written and produced by his sister Luísa Sobral and released for digital download as a single on 10 March 2017 by Sons em Trânsito. It premiered on 19 February of that year, when it was performed during the first semi-final of Festival da Canção 2017.

"Amar pelos dois" is a jazz waltz with the lyrical theme of heartbreak after a breakup. The track received praise from music critics. The song earned the Sobral siblings various awards, including two Marcel Bezençon Awards. The track achieved commercial success, particularly in Europe, reaching either number one or top ten in several territories. It was certified platinum by the Associação Fonográfica Portuguesa (AFP). Sobral performed "Amar pelos dois" at his Excuse Me Tour and Paris, Lisboa Tour. It is included in the European Union Songbook as the all-time top Portuguese love song, and it is listed in the Guinness World Records. The song has been covered by several artists.

"Amar pelos dois" represented  in the Eurovision Song Contest 2017 in Kyiv, Ukraine. It amassed 758 points, setting the record for the highest score in the history of the competition, and is the only entry to top both the televoting and jury voting in the second half of the 2010s. Salvador Sobral performed the song alone on stage B, close to the audience, while the background LED screens displayed an enchanted forest.

Background and release 

"Amar pelos dois" was one of 16 songs commissioned by Rádio e Televisão de Portugal (RTP) for Festival da Canção 2017, Portugal's national selection for the Eurovision Song Contest 2017. The composers both created the song and selected the performer for their entry. Luísa Sobral composed "Amar pelos dois" specifically for her brother, Salvador: "I never thought about singing this song myself because when I wrote it I already had my brother's voice in mind. I was very fond of seeing him playing my song, because I think he is an extraordinary singer and because it gives me great joy to see him at the song contest and also that it turned out to be a family thing". Salvador Sobral stated that even though "Amar pelos dois" was created by Luísa, she gave him freedom to perform the song according to his artistic personality.

"Amar pelos dois" premiered on 19 February 2017, when it was performed for Festival da Canção 2017. The song was released for digital download and streaming as a single on 10 March 2017 via Sons em Trânsito. On 16 June 2017, it was released as a CD single by Sony Music.

Composition 
"Amar pelos dois" was written and produced by Luísa Sobral. The song is a jazz waltz with a length of three minutes and five seconds (3:05), that moves at a tempo of 92 beats per minute. It is composed in the key of F major and written in triple metre, with Salvador Sobral's vocals spanning from D4 to G5. Without background vocals, the song has an instrumentation consisting of strings and piano. Sobral stated that "Amar pelos dois" is "influenced by those old songs from the Great American Songbook, and it also has a touch of the beautiful bossa nova melodies". The song's lyrical theme is heartbreak after a breakup: "Meu bem / Ouve as minhas preces / Peço que regresses / Que me voltes a querer". Sobral described it as "a love song. A sad one".

Critical reception 
"Amar pelos dois" was met with positive reviews from music critics. Fabien Randanne of 20 minutes called the track a "superb melancholic song" and described it as a "delightfully anachronistic sound". Francisco Chacón of ABC noted that the song's jazz-pop tempo distinguished it from the "outlandish proposals in the otherwise kitsch music scene". The staff of Paris Match listed the song as one of their ten favourite entries of 2017, and noted a "great vocal mastery". Chris Zeiher of the Special Broadcasting Service noted the "simplicity" of the song, adding that "there's something refreshing and reflective" in it. Benny Royston of the Metro named the song "Portugal's best ever Eurovision entry", and commented that "sticking to Portuguese maintains the charm and charisma of this song that pulls at the heartstrings through musical composition". Christopher D. Shea of The New York Times described it as an "unexpectedly earnest ballad" that "has earned a loyal following for upending over-the-top Eurovision expectations", while Richard van de Crommert of De Telegraaf considered it Portugal's all-time best Eurovision entry. Jens Maier of Stern called the song a "surprise", adding that it "enchanted" the contest. Charlotte Runcie of The Daily Telegraph described it as an "artistic, beautifully crafted" and "sophisticated" song. Silvia Fumarola of la Repubblica wrote, "beautiful voice, romantic music. A ballad that breaks the mold: no choreography, no technological oddity".

Awards 
"Amar pelos dois" earned the Sobral siblings two Marcel Bezençon Awards: Salvador Sobral received the Artistic Award, whereas Luísa received the Composer Award.

At the ESC Radio Awards, "Amar pelos dois" won Best Song. It marked the first time since 's "Euphoria" that a Eurovision Song Contest winning entry also topped the ESC Radio Awards poll. Additionally, the song earned Salvador Sobral the Best Male Artist award.

Commercial performance 
"Amar pelos dois" achieved commercial success, particularly in Europe. In Portugal, the song reached number one on the singles chart compiled by the Associação Fonográfica Portuguesa (AFP) after its victory in the Eurovision Song Contest 2017. On the Portuguese download chart, the track debuted at number four, after winning Festival da Canção. The following week, it climbed to number three, and ultimately topped the chart. It received a platinum certification by the Associação Fonográfica Portuguesa (AFP) for selling over 10,000 units.

In the rest of Europe, "Amar pelos dois" appeared on several charts, topping the charts in both Finland and the Netherlands, peaking at number three in Luxembourg, Norway and Sweden, four in Denmark, five in Greece, six in Belgium, and 31 in the United Kingdom. On other singles charts, the song was a chart topper in Iceland, peaked at number six in Switzerland, eight in Hungary, and 22 in Austria. In France, it reached number four, and in Spain, "Amar pelos dois" debuted at number one. In the United States, "Amar pelos dois" peaked at number seven on the Billboard World Digital Songs chart, as one of the best-performing international digital singles.

Live performances
Salvador and Luísa Sobral, the latter of which composed "Amar pelos dois", first appeared on radio stations RFM and Rádio Comercial on 8 and 14 March 2017, respectively. On 2 May of that year, Salvador Sobral's performance for Spain Calling International became available on RTVE's website. On 25 May 2017, the Sobral siblings performed on RTP1's talk show Agora Nós. Sobral performed alongside Brazilian singer Caetano Veloso at the Eurovision Song Contest 2018, on 12 May of that year. On 31 October 2018, Sobral performed the song at the aRi[t]mar Awards in Santiago de Compostela, Spain. Sobral performed "Amar pelos dois" at his Excuse Me Tour and Paris, Lisboa Tour.

Eurovision Song Contest

Festival da Canção 2017 
On 5 December 2016, Luísa Sobral was announced as a participating songwriter of Festival da Canção 2017, Portugal's national selection for the Eurovision Song Contest 2017. On 18 January 2017, Salvador Sobral was announced to be performing her song, titled "Amar pelos dois". After being sent two songs by Luísa that she had written for the competition, Salvador selected "Amar pelos dois" as the song that he would like to perform. Luís Figueiredo, who did the string arrangement, also chose "Amar pelos dois" as the song to go through the competition's various phases. Salvador Sobral competed in the first semi-final on 19 February 2017, placing second with 20 points after winning the jury vote and coming third in the televote. In the final, held on 5 March of that year, he won the jury vote and came second in the televote, placing first overall with 22 points, becoming the Portuguese representative at the Eurovision Song Contest 2017.

In Kyiv 

The Eurovision Song Contest 2017 took place at the International Exhibition Centre in Kyiv, Ukraine, and consisted of two semi-finals on 9 and 11 May, followed by the final on 13 May 2017. Portugal was drawn to compete in the first half of the first semi-final, with the running order for the semi-finals being decided by the producers in order to avoid similar songs being placed next to each other. For the grand final, Portugal was drawn to compete in the first half. Sobral was one of the favorites to win the contest, according to bookmakers. With its tool, the "Eurosearch Song Contest", Google correctly predicted his victory. For the winner's encore, Salvador and Luísa Sobral sang the song as a duet, as they previously did in the national final.

For his performance, Salvador Sobral wore a black suit and performed alone on stage B, close to the audience. During the performance, the background LED screens displayed an enchanted forest. Sobral's victory was hailed in Portugal by the Assembly of the Republic, Prime Minister António Costa, Minister of Culture Luís Filipe Castro Mendes, and President Marcelo Rebelo de Sousa, who distinguished the Sobral siblings with the Order of Merit.

Record-breaking victory 
By earning 758 points overall in the grand final, "Amar pelos dois" became the highest-scoring entry in the history of the Eurovision Song Contest, overtaking 's "1944", which had scored 534 points the year before. The former is the only entry to top both the televoting and jury voting in the second half of the 2010s. In the grand final, "Amar pelos dois" received at least five televote points from every participating country. It is the first winning song entirely performed in a country's native language since 's "Molitva". Additionally, Portugal achieved the biggest winning margin of the decade, scoring 143 more points than the runners-up.

Points awarded to Portugal 
Below is a breakdown of points awarded to Portugal in the first semi-final and the grand final of the contest, and the breakdown of the televoting and jury voting conducted during the two shows. The country finished in first place on both occasions. In the semi-final, Portugal was ranked first with 370 points overall, garnering 197 from the televote and 173 from the jury vote. In the end, the country won the contest with 758 points overall; 376 from the televote and 382 from the jury vote. In the grand final, Portugal earned a total of 30 sets of 12 points out of 82 possible.

Legacy

European Union Songbook
"Amar pelos dois" is included in the European Union Songbook as the all-time top Portuguese love song. The song was the most voted by the public in a field of ten songs pre-selected by music professionals, thus representing Portugal in the category Love.

Guinness World Records
"Amar pelos dois" is listed in the Guinness World Records for "Most points scored at Eurovision".

Use in media 
"Amar pelos dois" is the opening theme song for the Brazilian telenovela Tempo de Amar on Rede Globo. It is featured on Salvador Sobral's live album Excuse Me (Ao Vivo). The track generated a two-part television documentary titled Sem Fazer Planos do Que Virá Depois and aired by Portuguese broadcaster RTP. As the central theme, it is played and sung throughout the documentary. The song is featured on the soundtrack album for the Netflix film Eurovision Song Contest: The Story of Fire Saga. In the film, Sobral is seen performing "Amar pelos dois" as a street performer. The track appears on the compilation album Now That's What I Call Eurovision Song Contest.

Cover versions 
The following acts recording cover versions of "Amar pelos dois":
 Jitka Zelenková recorded a Czech-language version for her album Intimity.
 Arisa, winner of the Sanremo Music Festival 2014, recorded an Italian-language version for her album Una nuova Rosalba in città.
 Tiziana Tosca Donati, winner of the Sanremo Music Festival 1996, recorded an Italian-language version for her album Morabeza.

Track listings 
 Digital download
 "Amar pelos dois" – 3:05

 CD single
 "Amar pelos dois" – 3:05
 "Amar pelos dois" (Instrumental) – 2:56

Credits and personnel 
 Salvador Sobral – vocals
 Luísa Sobral – production, songwriting
 Luís Figueiredo – string arrangement, piano
 Quarteto Arabesco – strings

Credits adapted from the liner notes of "Amar pelos dois" promo single and from ESC Portugal.

Charts

Certifications

Release history

Notes

References 

2017 singles
2017 songs
2010s ballads
Bossa nova songs
Eurovision Song Contest winning songs
Eurovision songs of 2017
Eurovision songs of Portugal
Jazz ballads
Portuguese songs
Portuguese-language songs
Songs about heartache
Vocal jazz songs
Number-one singles in Iceland
Number-one singles in Portugal
Golden Globes (Portugal) winners